Albright-Dukes House, also known as the Dukes House, is a historic home located at Laurens, Laurens County, South Carolina. It was built about 1904, and is a two-story, Dutch Colonial Revival style frame dwelling. It features a cross-gambrel roof and the shingled gambrel ends with Palladian windows. It has a single-story porch, supported by Tuscan order columns.

It was added to the National Register of Historic Places in 1986.

References

Houses on the National Register of Historic Places in South Carolina
Colonial Revival architecture in South Carolina
Houses completed in 1904
Houses in Laurens County, South Carolina
National Register of Historic Places in Laurens County, South Carolina